Ithaca High School may refer to:
Ithaca High School (Ithaca, New York)
Ithaca High School (Michigan)
Ithaca High School (Wisconsin)